The Singapore Badminton Hall (Abbreviation: SBH; Chinese: 新加坡羽毛球馆; pinyin: xīnjiāpō yǔmáoqiúguǎn) is an indoor sports hall for badminton located at 1 Lorong 23 Geylang in Geylang, Singapore.

Background
Three years after the closure of the original Singapore Badminton Hall in 2008, the new Singapore Badminton Hall was opened in 2011 at Lorong 23 Geylang with an land area of 2,500 sqm. The current badminton hall has 14 of Olympic-standard courts, and was installed with permanent seatings for 400 spectators, hospitality and VIP viewing galleries, the hall was divided into two sections: with a premier section of six courts in an air-conditioned complex, and a deluxe section of eight courts without air-conditioning. There was also space to erect another 1,400 spectator seats for competitions. Outside the main hall, there is a gymnasium and 14 dormitory rooms for badminton trainees.

It currently serves as a sport venue for badminton trainings and main tournaments like Singapore Badminton Association National Age-group Doubles Championships, the Pilot Pen National Age-group Singles Championships and the Li-Ning Singapore Youth Invitational Series.

See also
 Sport in Singapore

References

Sports venues completed in 2011
Indoor arenas in Singapore
Badminton in Singapore
Geylang
Badminton venues
2011 establishments in Singapore